Lumbini Royal College Kandy is a national school in Kandy, Sri Lanka.

See also
 List of schools in Central Province, Sri Lanka

References

National schools in Sri Lanka
Schools in Kandy
Boys' schools in Sri Lanka